The Dutch Basketball League (DBL) All-Star Team, also known as All-DBL Team, is a team constituted by the main players in a season of the Dutch Basketball League, the highest professional basketball league in the Netherlands. This team is based on players' performance throughout the regular season. After the end of the season, the best players of each position are chosen. It is not to be confused with the DBL All-Star Gala, an event where the best players in the league come together.

Teams

1973–2010

Selections by player

References

Dutch Basketball League awards